Loudry Meilana Setiawan (born May 8, 1991) is an Indonesian former footballer.

References

External links

1991 births
Living people
People from Gresik Regency
Association football midfielders
Indonesian footballers
Liga 1 (Indonesia) players
Persisam Putra Samarinda players
Bali United F.C. players
Sportspeople from East Java